The unbuilt U10 line, of the Berlin U-Bahn, was part of East Berlin's "200-km-plan" of 1953 – 1955 (through 1977). It would have been a metro line from Falkenberg, in the northeastern part of the city, to Alexanderplatz, and up to Steglitz then terminating at Drakestraße in Lichterfelde. The designated letter name of the line was "F" until 1 July 1972, when it was changed to "Line 10". Because a number of tunnels and stations were constructed to accommodate the proposed line with elements visible at transfer stations and elsewhere, the line is popularly known as the "Phantomlinie" (Phantom line).

Overview
In 1993, after reunification, the original 1950s plans for the U10 were discarded in favour of a provisional line U3 (not to be confused with the current U3). The north-eastern branch of the U3 line between Weißensee and Potsdamer Platz follow the path of the proposed U10 line, but U3 then crosses the Madgeburger Platz to Wittenbergplatz and follows the path of the existing U1 line to Uhlandstraße. Plans for the southwestern section of U10 were abandoned for this routing because it ran parallel to the S-Bahn line S1 and was perceived as being redundant, although the economic impact of said redundancy has never been studied.

Planning for U10 was officially removed from the Berlin transport master plan in 2003 (Measures 2015), and it is no longer considered part of said public transport network master plan through at least 2030. The aforementioned revised U10 alignment (shown in the above diagram as a dark turquoise dashed line) nevertheless remains part of Berlin's Land-use plan since 1994, which means that construction along the proposed route must accommodate the eventuality of such a line. For example, the Rotes Rathaus station on the U5 line extension (which opened in 2020) includes a lower tunnel for the proposed U10.

Stations

Existing portions
 At Alexanderplatz station on the U5, two outer platforms were constructed to allow same-platform transfers. Today, these tracks are used for parking trains and for special service such as the Tunnel Tour. When the station was redesigned in the 1960s, the two-tunnel chamber toward Weissensee added a shielded chambers in accommodate two single-track tunnel boring machines.
The station at Berlin-Rathaus on the U5 extension includes a lower level designed to accommodate a transfer to line U10.
During the renovation of Mühlendamm Bridge in 1936, a 95-metre tunnel section was constructed below the Spree river bed. After the reunification of Berlin, the plans for using this tunnel were abandoned because of the development of Fischerinsel, and the tunnel was filled in in 1997.
 The 2006 renovation of the station at Potsdamer Platz includes a platform for line U10, and the station includes overpasses and underpasses to provide connections. The station includes a 392 m long tunnel for the U3/U10 line which is occasionally used for events.
 The 1967–1969 construction of the U7 station at Kleistpark includes a 90-m long section for a lower U10 platform and staircase connections to this platform.
 During the construction of the Bundesautobahn 100, a platform for a U10 stop was erected under the freeway to allow connection to the U4 and S-bahn at Innsbrucker Platz. 
 During construction of the extension of the U9 line from Walther-Schreiber-Platz to Steglitz in 1968-1974, a building to house switching equipment was constructed, and the space beneath Schoßstrasse included a two-storey tunnel. The U9 line was never completed as envisioned, so the U9 line uses 1536 metres of tunnel built for the unfinished U10 in order to allow trains to switch back.

References 
The information in this article is based on that in its German equivalent.

Berlin U-Bahn lines